This is a list of National Hockey League (NHL) players who have played at least one game in the NHL from 1917 to present and have a last name that starts with "F".

List updated as of the 2018–19 NHL season.

Fa

 Robby Fabbri
 Dante Fabbro
 Brian Fahey
 Jim Fahey
 Trevor Fahey
 Bill Fairbairn
 Cade Fairchild
 Kelly Fairchild
 Radek Faksa
 Justin Falk
 Bob Falkenberg
 Pat Falloon
 Scott Fankhouser
 Oscar Fantenberg
 Joel Farabee
 Jeff Farkas
 Norm "Rocky" Farr
 David Farrance
 Walt "Whitey" Farrant
 Mike Farrell
 Dave Farrish
 Hudson Fasching
 Gord Fashoway
 Brad Fast
 Jesper Fast
 Viktor Fasth
 Drew Fata
 Rico Fata
 Mario Faubert
 Justin Faulk
 Alex Faulkner
 Ted Fauss
 Andre Faust
 Doug Favell
 Mark Fayne

Fe

 Dave Feamster
 Glen Featherstone
 Tony Featherstone
 Bernie Federko
 Fedor Fedorov
 Sergei Fedorov
 Todd Fedoruk
 Ruslan Fedotenko
 Anatoli Fedotov
 Taylor Fedun
 Brent Fedyk
 Martin Fehervary
 Eric Fehr
 Chris Felix
 Brian Felsner
 Denny Felsner
 Tony Feltrin
 Paul Fenton
 David Fenyves
 Andrew Ference
 Brad Ference
 Tom Fergus
 Craig Ferguson
 Dylan Ferguson
 George Ferguson
 John Ferguson
 Lorne Ferguson
 Norm Ferguson
 Scott Ferguson
 Jonathan Ferland
 Manny Fernandez
 Mark Ferner
 Chris Ferraro
 Landon Ferraro
 Mario Ferraro
 Peter Ferraro
 Ray Ferraro
 Benn Ferriero
 Brett Festerling
 Viacheslav Fetisov

Fi

 Kevin Fiala
 Jesse Fibiger
 Eric Fichaud
 Vernon Fiddler
 Mike Fidler
 Wilf Field
 Guyle Fielder
 Nikita Filatov
 Jonathan Filewich
 Dmitri Filimonov
 Bob Fillion
 Marcel Fillion
 Tommy Filmore
 Valtteri Filppula
 Jeff Finger
 Lloyd Finkbeiner
 Brian Finley
 Jeff Finley
 Joe Finley
 Steven Finn
 Sid Finney
 Eddie Finnigan
 Frank Finnigan
 Giovanni Fiore
 Peter Fiorentino
 Christian Fischer
 Jiri Fischer
 Patrick Fischer
 Ron Fischer
 Stephane Fiset
 Alvin Fisher
 Craig Fisher
 Dunc Fisher
 Joe Fisher
 Mike Fisher
 Mark Fistric
 Bob Fitchner
 Rusty Fitzgerald
 Tom Fitzgerald
 Zack Fitzgerald
 Sandy Fitzpatrick
 Mark Fitzpatrick
 Rory Fitzpatrick
 Ross Fitzpatrick

Fl

 Wade Flaherty
 Fernie Flaman
 Patrick Flatley
 Tomas Fleischmann
 Gerry Fleming
 Reg Fleming
 John Flesch
 Steven Fletcher
 Bill Flett
 Cale Fleury
 Haydn Fleury
 Marc-Andre Fleury
 Theoren Fleury
 Todd Flichel
 Ryan Flinn
 Rob Flockhart
 Ron Flockhart
 Mark Flood
 Justin Florek
 Larry Floyd
 Brian Flynn

Fo

 Dan Focht
 Warren Foegele
 Bryan Fogarty
 Steven Fogarty
 Lee Fogolin
 Lee Fogolin, Sr.
 Peter Folco
 Gerry Foley
 Rick Foley
 Marcus Foligno
 Mike Foligno
 Nick Foligno
 Christian Folin
 Bill Folk
 Len Fontaine
 Jon Fontas
 Val Fonteyne
 Lou Fontinato
 Spencer Foo
 Adam Foote
 Callan Foote
 Nolan Foote
 Colin Forbes
 Dave Forbes
 Mike Forbes
 Jake Forbes
 Derek Forbort
 Brian Ford
 Connie Forey
 Alex Formenton
 Jakob Forsbacka Karlsson
 Filip Forsberg
 Peter Forsberg
 Jack Forsey
 Gustav Forsling
 Gus Forslund
 Tomas Forslund
 Alex Forsyth

 Dave Fortier
 Marc Fortier
 Alexandre Fortin
 Jean-Francois Fortin
 Ray Fortin
 Maxime Fortunus
 Alex Foster
 Brian Foster
 Corey Foster
 Dwight Foster
 Harry "Yip" Foster
 Herb Foster
 Kurtis Foster
 Norm Foster
 Scott Foster
 Nick Fotiu
 Kris Foucault
 Liam Foudy
 Mike Fountain
 Cam Fowler
 Jimmy Fowler
 Hec Fowler
 Tom Fowler
 Adam Fox 
 Greg Fox
 Jim Fox
 Matt Foy
 Frank Foyston

Fr

 Bob Frampton
 Lou Franceschetti
 Bobby Francis
 Emile Francis
 Ron Francis
 Pavel Francouz
 Jimmy Franks
 Cody Franson
 Johan Franzen
 Archie Fraser
 Colin Fraser
 Charles Fraser 
 Curt Fraser
 Gord Fraser
 Harvey Fraser
 Iain Fraser
 Jamie Fraser
 Mark Fraser
 Scott Fraser
 Dan Frawley
 Jeff Frazee
 Kyle Freadrich
 Trent Frederic
 Ray Frederick
 Frank Fredrickson
 Kris Fredheim
 Mark Freer
 Irv Frew
 Tim Friday
 Dan Fridgen
 Doug Friedman
 Mark Friedman
 Alex Friesen
 Jeff Friesen
 Karl Friesen
 Ron Friest
 Len Frig
 Trevor Frischmon
 Jamie Fritsch
 Dan Fritsche
 Mitch Fritz
 Tanner Fritz
 Martin Frk 
 Bob Froese
 Byron Froese
 Michael Frolik
 Alexander Frolov
 Harry Frost
 Morgan Frost
 Miroslav Frycer
 Bob Fryday

Ft–Fu

 Robbie Ftorek
 Zachary Fucale
 Grant Fuhr
 Yutaka Fukufuji
 Kaden Fulcher
 Larry Fullan
 Michael Funk
 Mark Fusco
 Owen Fussey

See also
 hockeydb.com NHL Player List - F

Players